The 2000 Texas Longhorns baseball team represented the University of Texas at Austin in the 2000 NCAA Division I baseball season. The Longhorns played their home games at Disch–Falk Field. The team was coached by Augie Garrido in his 4th season at Texas.

The Longhorns reached the College World Series, where they were eliminated in two games by eventual champion LSU and Florida State.

Personnel

Roster

Coaches

Schedule and results

Notes

References

Texas Longhorns baseball seasons
Texas Longhorns
Texas
College World Series seasons
Texas Longhorns Baseball